Francis Winnington may refer to: 
Francis Winnington (Solicitor-General) (1634–1700), English lawyer and Solicitor-General to King Charles II  
Francis Winnington (Droitwich MP) (1704–c. 1754), English politician and barrister